Aarid Maql Saab is a mountain of northern Lebanon. It has an altitude of 1462 metres.

References

Mountains of Lebanon